George Chadwick may refer to:

 George Whitefield Chadwick (1854–1931), American composer
 George B. Chadwick (1880–1961), All-American football player and coach
 George Chadwick (bishop) (1840–1923), Irish bishop